HDFC ERGO is a 51:49 joint venture firm between HDFC and ERGO International AG, one of the insurance entities of the Munich Re Group in Germany operating in the insurance field under the BFSI sector. The company offers complete range of general insurance products in retail, corporate and rural sectors. The retail sector includes various products like health insurance, vehicle insurance, travel insurance, home insurance, personal accident insurance and cyber insurance. The Corporate sector includes products like liability, marine, and property insurance. Rural sector products include rainfall index insurance, Pradhan Mantri Fasal Bima Yojna and cattle insurance policy.

History 

HDFC Ltd. And ERGO International AG formed a joint venture firm named HDFC ERGO General Insurance Company Limited. ERGO became a 49% stakeholder in the Company in 2015. In June 2019,HDFC announced plans to acquire 51.2 per cent stake in Apollo Munich Health Insurance and later merged it with its general insurance arm, HDFC ERGO.

In 2020, HDFC Ergo Health Insurance( earlier known as Apollo Munich Health Insurance) merged with the company after the receipt of final approval from the Insurance Regulatory and Development Authority of India (IRDAI) making it the second-largest private insurer in the accident and health insurance business. With this merger, the company's product suite expanded to over 50 in this segment.

In May 2021,Housing Development Finance Corporation (HDFC),had entered into a share purchase agreement for sale of 44,12,000 equity shares of Rs. 10 each, representing 0.62% of the issued and paid-up share capital of HDFC ERGO, in accordance with the direction of Reserve Bank of India to reduce its shareholding in the latter to 50% or below, and subsequent to this HDFC ERGO would cease to be a subsidiary company of HDFC.

Technology 
The firm's website has an AI-based chatbot DIA which can answer many of the queries. HDFC ERGO General Insurance has adopted the Robotics process automation and voice analytics to improve customer experience. With these technologies, the company claims to process health insurance in 15 minutes and issues Health and Motor Insurance Policies to the customers within 5 minutes through the digital platforms. A mobile application, the Insurance Portfolio Organiser (IPO) app, has also been built and offers its services based on geo-location.  The company is aiming to transform itself into an ‘AI-first company’, wherein over 30% of customer service requests is handled by artificial intelligence (AI) and more than 50% of customers are using the digital platform to avail of any service after becoming policyholders.

References

External links
  

Privately held companies of India
Joint ventures
Insurance companies of India
Financial services companies based in Mumbai
Companies with year of establishment missing
HDFC Group